Neil Patterson may refer to:

Neil Patterson (artist), Canadian artist
Neil Patterson (athlete) (1885–1948), American athlete

See also
Neal Patterson (1949–2017), CEO of Cerner
Neil Paterson (disambiguation)